Olaf Manthey (born 21 April 1955 in Bonn) is a German former race car driver, and current owner of Porsche team Manthey Racing.

Manthey's career as a driver began in 1974. In the 1980s, he won two races of the Deutsche Tourenwagen Meisterschaft. Retiring as DTM racer after 1993, since 1994 he worked for Persson Motorsport in Deutsche Tourenwagen Meisterschaft, which ran Mercedes cars.

After the DTM faltered in late 1996, he set up his own business near the Nürburgring, focusing on Porsche road cars and his team Manthey Racing in the German Porsche Carrera Cup, which he as driver had won in 1990, and in the Porsche Supercup. He continued racing on the long Nürburgring and has won 28 VLN endurance races there, mostly in the 1990s with DTM-based Mercedes 190, later with Porsche 911 GT3. Since 1999, his team receives a various degree of factory support from Porsche, or acts as factory team, or with factory-paid drivers.

In 2012, Manthey decided to leave the VLN series and enter the International GT Open instead. However, the team still ran a car at the 24 Hours of Nurburgring that year.

Results

Driver 
 1982 1st Ford Sport cup, Ford Escort RS 2000
 1983 1st Ford Sport cup
 1984 2nd DTM, Rover Vitesse
 1985 2nd DTM, Rover Vitesse
 1988 High speed record, Audi 200 Turbo
 1990 1st Porsche Carrera Cup Deutschland, Porsche 911 Carrera
 1992 – 1995: 22 VLN wins, Mercedes 190 EVO II

Team
 1996 4th ranked Team in Porsche Supercup
 1997 1st & 2nd Driver, 1st Team, Porsche Supercup
 1998 1st & 2nd Driver, 1st Team, Porsche Supercup
 1999 1st GT class 1999 24 Hours of Le Mans, Porsche 911 GT3-R
 1999 1st Driver & Team, Porsche Supercup
 2000 1st Driver & Team, Porsche Supercup
 2001 3rd Team, DTM, Mercedes
 2001 3rd Team Porsche Supercup
 2002 4th Team Porsche Supercup
 2003 3rd 24 Hours Nürburgring
 2004 3rd 24h Nürburgring
 2005 9th 24h Nürburgring
 2006 1st 24h Nürburgring
 2007 1st 24h Nürburgring
 2008 1st, 2nd, 5th, 8th and 12th 24h Nürburgring
 2009 1st, 3rd and 7th 24h Nürburgring
 2011 1st, 10th and 13th  24h Nürburgring
 2013 1st GT class 2013 24 Hours of Le Mans, Porsche 911 RSR (with factory support)

References

German racing drivers
Deutsche Tourenwagen Masters drivers
1955 births
Living people
Sportspeople from Bonn
Racing drivers from North Rhine-Westphalia
Porsche Supercup drivers
World Sportscar Championship drivers
Sports car racing team owners
Porsche Carrera Cup Germany drivers